The sixth edition of the Copa América de Ciclismo was held on 8 January 2006 in São Paulo, Brazil. Nilceu Santos (Scott) repeated his 2005 victory, beating Rodrigo Brito (São Caetano) and Héctor Figueiras (São Caetano) in a bunch sprint.

Results

References 
 cyclingnews

Copa América de Ciclismo
Copa
Copa
January 2006 sports events in South America